The IMBEL MD97 is a Brazilian assault rifle used by the Brazilian Army, Special Forces, and police forces.

History 
The MD97 is a selective-fire or semi-automatic assault rifle that has been produced by IMBEL in Brazil since 1997. It is based upon the IMBEL MD2, which is itself based upon the FN FAL.

Variants 
 MD97L- standard full-size, selective-fire version for use with Brazilian Army.
 MD97LM- MD97L with the addition of MIL-STD-1913 rails for mounting scopes and tactical attachments intended for use by Brazilian Special forces.
 MD97LC- compact, semi-automatic only version for use with domestic police forces.

Users 

Brazilian Army
Military Police of Rio de Janeiro State
Military Police of São Paulo State
Military Police of Espírito Santo State
Military Brigade of Rio Grande do Sul
Military Police of Paraná State
National Public Security Force

References

M
5.56 mm assault rifles
Rifles of Brazil
IMBEL firearms